Marcus Asinius Marcellus was the name of two men of the Asinii.

Marcus Asinius Marcellus, the Elder

Marcus Asinius Marcellus was consul in 54 as the colleague of Manius Acilius Aviola; it was the same year the Emperor Claudius died. According to Paul von Rohden, Marcellus was the son of Marcus Asinius Agrippa, consul in 25, and the paternal grandson of Vipsania Agrippina, although he admits to the slight chance Marcellus was a grandson of Asinia and Marcus Claudius Marcellus.

Marcellus was a Senator active in the reigns of the emperors Claudius and Nero. In the year 60 Marcellus was caught up in a scandal involving a relative of a Praetor who forged his will. The associates in the scandal were disgraced and punished. Although Marcellus was also disgraced and his accomplices executed, he escaped punishment because the Emperor Nero intervened--reportedly because he was "great-grandson of Asinius Pollio and bore a character far from contemptible."

Marcus Asinius Marcellus, the Younger
The younger Marcus Asinius Marcellus was a consul ordinarius in 104  as the colleague of Sextus Attius Suburanus Aemilianus, and son or grandson of the consul of 54. Edmund Groag suggested he is identical to the homonymous man mentioned as a member of the College of Pontifices around AD 101/102. Nothing more is known of him.

References

Senators of the Roman Empire
Imperial Roman consuls
1st-century Romans
2nd-century Romans
Marcellus, Marcus
Year of birth unknown
Year of death unknown